A rock shed is a civil engineering structure used in mountainous areas where rock slides and land slides create highway closure problems. A rock shed is built over a roadway that is in the path of the slide.  They are equally used to protect railroads.  They are usually designed as a heavy reinforced concrete covering over the road, protecting the surface and vehicles from damage due to the falling rocks with a sloping surface to deflect slip material beyond the road, however an alternative is to include an impact-absorbing layer above the ceiling. A further use of this type of structure may be seen protecting the A4 road; although constructed primarily to alleviate risk from falling rocks from a limestone seam it also serves to protect against objects or persons falling from the Clifton Suspension Bridge where the height differential of approximately 70 metres from the bridge to the bottom of the Avon Gorge would give sufficient kinetic energy to even a relatively small item to cause injury on impact.

Examples of rock sheds

 A4 road where it passes under the Clifton Suspension Bridge, Bristol, England, constructed in 1980
 California State Route 1 at Pitkins Curve, just north of Limekiln State Park, constructed in 2014
 Ferguson Rock Shed, to rectify a closure of California State Route 140 by a landslide in 2006, completion expected in the mid-2020s

See also
Avalanche dam
Rock shelter
Snow shed

References

Civil engineering
Infrastructure